Trace Mountains is the musical project of American indie rock musician Dave Benton. Benton was formerly the lead singer of lo-fi band LVL UP.

History
In 2016, Benton released a collection of songs titled Buttery Sprouts & Other Songs, his first release under the moniker Trace Mountains. Benton released his first full-length album as Trace Mountains in 2018 titled A Partner to Lean On. In 2020, Benton released his second album as Trace Mountains titled Lost in the Country. Benton released his third full-length album as Trace Mountains, House of Confusion, on October 22, 2021.

Discography
Studio albums
A Partner to Lean On (2018)
Lost in the Country (2020)
House of Confusion (2021)

References

Year of birth missing (living people)
Living people
Place of birth missing (living people)
American indie rock musicians
Lame-O Records artists